The Unified Soil Classification System (USCS) is a soil classification system used in engineering and geology to describe the texture and grain size of a soil. The classification system can be applied to most unconsolidated materials, and is represented by a two-letter symbol. Each letter is described below (with the exception of Pt):

If the soil has 5–12% by weight of fines passing a #200 sieve (5% < P#200 < 12%), both grain size distribution and plasticity have a significant effect on the engineering properties of the soil, and dual notation may be used for the group symbol. For example, GW-GM corresponds to "well-graded gravel with silt."

If the soil has more than 15% by weight retained on a #4 sieve (R#4 > 15%), there is a significant amount of gravel, and the suffix "with gravel" may be added to the group name, but the group symbol does not change. For example, SP-SM could refer to "poorly graded SAND with silt" or  "poorly graded SAND with silt and gravel."

Symbol chart

ASTM D-2487

See also 

 AASHTO Soil Classification System
 AASHTO
 ASTM International

References 

Specific

Soil classification